Michael Bostock is an American computer scientist and data-visualisation specialist. He is one of the co-creators of Observable and noted as one of the key developers of D3.js, a JavaScript library used for producing dynamic, interactive, online data visualizations. He was also involved in the preceding Protovis framework.

Early life
Bostock was a PhD student at Stanford University, advised by Jeffrey Heer.

Career
Until 2015, Bostock was working for the New York Times where he led complex data-visualisation projects. He helped create interactive articles for the New York Times and shared the 2013, 2014, and 2015 Gerald Loeb Awards for Images/Visuals.

Bostock is the CTO and co-founder of Observablehq.com, an online notebooks services for "exploring data manipulation and thinking with code". He is also an adviser to data transformation platform provider Trifacta.

Bostock was interviewed in the Data Stories podcast and presented at Eyeo 2014. The "Innovation Report" of his employer, the New York Times, called him a "digital superstar" and Edward Tufte predicted that he will become one of the most important people for the future of data visualisation.

References

External links 
 
 Mike Bostock at Bl.ocks

Living people
Year of birth missing (living people)
Stanford University alumni
Information graphic designers
Gerald Loeb Award winners for Images, Graphics, Interactives, and Visuals
The New York Times visual journalists
D3.js people